Renée (without the accent in non-French speaking countries) is a French/Latin feminine given name.

Renée is the female form of René, with the extra –e making it feminine according to French grammar. The name Renée is the French form of the late Roman name Renatus and the meaning is reborn or born again. In medieval times, the meaning was associated with the Christian concept of being spiritually born again through baptism.

Renee was among the top 100 names given to girls in the United States in the late 1950s, the 1960s, the 1970s and the early 1980s. It ranked as the 734th most popular name given to American girls in 2008 and is continuing to fall in popularity.

Given name
Renée and Renato, British male/female vocal duo
Renée Adorée (1898–1933), French actress of the silent era
Renee Alway (born 1986), American fashion model
Renee Amoore (born 1953), American health care advocate
Renée Asherson (born 1920), English actress
Renée Aubin (born 1963), Canadian Olympic fencer
Reneé Austin, American singer
Renee Baillargeon (born 1954), psychology professor at the University of Illinois Urbana-Champaign
Renee Bargh (born 1986), Australian celebrity and TV presenter
Renée Björling (1898–1975), Swedish actress
Renée A. Blake, Caribbean American linguistics professor at New York University
Renee Blount (born 1957), American professional tennis player
Renée Pietrafesa Bonnet (born 1938), French/Uruguayan musician
Renée Bordereau (1770–1824), French woman who disguised herself as a man
Renee Botta, Chair of the Department of Media, Film & Journalism Studies at the University of Denver
Renée of Bourbon (1494–1539), daughter of Gilbert de Bourbon, Count of Montpensier
Renée Marie Bumb (born 1960), district judge for the United States District Court for the District of New Jersey
Renée Byer (born 1958), American documentary photojournalist
Renée Carl (1875–1954), French actress of the silent era
Renée Caroline de Roullay Créquy, Marquise de Créquy (1714–1803), French aristocrat
Renée Carpentier-Wintz (1913–2003), French painter
Renee Chatterton (born 1989), Australian Olympic rower
Renée Chen (born 1985), Taiwanese singer and songwriter
Renee Chenault-Fattah (born 1957), Philadelphia news anchor
Renee Cipriano, former director of the Illinois Environmental Protection Agency
Renee Cleary (born 1972), American beach volleyball player
Renee Cole (born c. 1971), American beauty pageant contestant, Miss Maryland 1993
Renée Coleman, Canadian-born American actress
Renée Colliard (born 1933), Swiss alpine skier
Renee Cox (born 1960), Jamaican-American artist, political activist and curator
Renée de Dinteville (15??–1580), German-Roman monarch
Renee del Colle, Canadian wheelchair basketball player
Renée Doria (born 1921), French opera singer
Renée Dunan (1892–1936), French writer
Renee Ellmers (born 1964), the U.S. representative for North Carolina's 2nd congressional district
Renée Estevez (born 1967), American actress
Renée Jeanne Falconetti (1892–1946), French stage and film actress
Renée Faure (1919–2005), French actress
Renée Ferrer de Arréllaga (born 1944), Paraguayan poet and novelist
Renee Fitzgerald, Irish camogie player
Renee Flavell (born 1982), New Zealand badminton player
Renée Fleming (born 1959), American soprano
Renée Fox (born 1928), American sociologist
Renée of France (1510–1574), younger daughter of Louis XII of France
Renée French (born 1963), American comics writer and illustrator
Renée French (actress), American actress
Renée Friedman, American egyptologist
Renee Gadd (1908–2003), Argentine-born British film actress
Renée Gailhoustet (born 1929), French architect
Renée Garilhe (1923–1991), French Olympic fencer
Renée Geyer (1953–2023), Australian singer
Renée Gill Pratt (born 1954), local politician from New Orleans
Renee Godfrey (1919–1964), American stage and motion picture actress and singer
Renee Ghosh, Lebanese actress
Renée Elise Goldsberry (born 1971), American actress, singer and songwriter
Renee Grant-Williams, Nashville, Tennessee vocal coach
Renée Green (born 1959), American artist, writer and filmmaker
Renee Griffin, aka Renee Allman, aka Renee Ammann (born 1968), American actress
Reneé Hall (born 1971), American police chief
Renée Hayek, Lebanese writer and novelist
Renee Hobbs (born 1958), American educator, scholar and advocate for media literacy education
Renée Houston (1902–1980), Scottish comedy actor and revue artist
Renee Humphrey (born 1975), American actress
Renée Jeryd (born 1965), Swedish social democratic politician
Renée Jones (born 1958), American actress
Renée Jones-Bos, 44th representative of the Kingdom of the Netherlands to the United States
Renee Kelly (1888–1965), British stage and film actress
Renée Kosel (born 1943), member of the Illinois House of Representatives
Renee Laravie (born 1959), American Olympic swimmer
Renée Lawless (born 1960), American actress
Renee Leota (born 1990), New Zealand association football player
Renee Lim, Australian actress, television presenter and medical doctor
Renee MacRae (b. 1940), a Scottish woman who is missing, presumed to have been murdered
Renee Magee (born 1959), American Olympic swimmer
Renée Manfredi, American novelist
Renee Marlin-Bennett (b. 1959), political science professor at Johns Hopkins University
Renée Mayer (1900-1969), British child actress 
Renee McHugh (born c. 1988), Philippines fashion model and beauty queen
Renée J. Miller, computer science professor at University of Toronto, Canada
Renée Montagne, American radio journalist
Renee Montgomery, American basketball player
Renée Morisset (1928–2009), Canadian pianist
Renee Nele (born 1932), German sculptor
Renée Nicoux (born 1951), French politician and member of the Senate of France
Renee O'Connor (born 1971), American actress, producer and director
Marie-Renée Oget (born 1945), French politician, member of the National Assembly
Renee Olstead (born 1989), American actress and singer
Renee Peck (born 1953), American writer
Renee Percy, Canadian actress, writer, and comedian
Renee Poetschka, Australian athlete
Renee Powell (born 1946), an American professional golfer
Renee Props (born 1962), American actress
Renee Rabinowitz (born 1934), Israeli-American psychologist and lawyer
Reneé Rapp (born 2000), American actress and singer
Renee Raudman, an actress and voice actress
Renée Richards (born 1934), American ophthalmologist, author and tennis player
Renee Robinson, American dancer 
Renée Roca (born 1963), American figure skater and choreographer
Renee Roberts (1908–1996), English actress
Renee Rollason (born 1989), Australian football (soccer) player
Renee Rosnes (born 1962), Canadian musician
Renee Roszel, American writer
Renée Saint-Cyr (1904–2004), French actress
Renee Sands (born 1974), American singer and actress
Renée Scheltema (born 1951), Dutch documentary filmmaker
Renee Schulte (born 1970), American politician
Renee Schuurman (1939–2001), South African tennis player
Renée Schwarzenbach-Wille (1883–1959), Swiss photographer
Renee Sebastian (born 1973), Filipino-American singer and songwriter
Renee Short (1919–2003), British politician
Renee Simons (born 1972), Canadian curler
Renée Simonsen (born 1965), Danish model and writer
Renée Sintenis (1888–1965), German artist
Renée Slegers (born 1989), Dutch international football midfielder
Jamie Renée Smith (born 1987), American actress
Renée Felice Smith (born 1985), American actress
Renée Sonnenberg, Canadian curler
Renée Soutendijk (born 1957), Dutch actress
Renee Spearman (born 1969), gospel recording artist, singer, songwriter and producer
Renée Stobrawa (1897–1971), German screenwriter and film actress
Renee Stout (born 1958), American artist
Renee Tajima-Peña (born c. 1958), film director and producer
Renée Taylor (born 1933), American actress
Renee Taylor (writer) (born 1929), New Zealand writer and playwright
Renee Tenison (born 1968), American model and actress
Renee Torres (1911–1998), Mexican-American actress
Renee Lynn Vicary (1957–2002), American competitive female bodybuilder
Renée Victor (born 1953), American actress
Renée Vivien (1877–1909), British poet writing in French

Renée Webster, Australian filmmaker
Renée Weibel (born 1986), Swiss actress

Renee Williams (1977–2007), American woman believed to be the largest woman in the world at the time of her death
Renee Young (born 1984), Canadian sports broadcaster, currently working with the WWE
Renée Zellweger (born 1969), American actress

In fiction
Renée, a minor character in Buffy the Vampire Slayer
Renée, a character in Claymore
Renee Blasey, aka Wraith, from the battle royale video game Apex Legends
Renee Bradshaw, character in the British soap opera Coronation Street
Renée Divine Buchanan, character in the American soap opera One Life to Live
Renée DuMonde, character in the television soap opera Days of Our Lives
Renée Dwyer, a character in the Twilight novel series
Renee Montoya, a DC Comics character
Renee Perry, a character in the ABC series Desperate Housewives
Renée Rienne, character in the spy-fi series Alias
Renée de Villefort, first wife of Gérard de Villefort in Alexandre Dumas's The Count of Monte Cristo
Renee Walker, a character in the TV series 24
Renee, a character in the TV series Watchmen
Renee, a character in the film The Grudge 3
Renée Picard, a Star Trek character and ancestor of Jean-Luc Picard

Surname
Lyne Renée (born 1979), Belgian actress

Variants in different languages
رينيه Arabic
Rena English, Polish
Renae English
Renáta Czech, Hungarian, Slovak
Renata  Serbian, Croatian,
, Czech, German, Italian, Polish, Portuguese, Romanian, Slovene, Spanish, Lithuanian
Renate Dutch, French, German
Renátka Czech
Renča Czech
Renea Bosnian, Croatian, Serbian, Slovene
Renée Dutch, French
Renee English
Reneeke Dutch
Reneetje Dutch
Renia Polish
Renita English, Spanish
Renāte Latvian

See also

Renée (disambiguation)

References

French feminine given names